Zlatna Greda is a settlement in the region of Baranja, Croatia. Administratively, it is located in the Bilje municipality within the Osijek-Baranja County. The population is 12.

See also
Osijek-Baranja county
Baranja

References

Populated places in Osijek-Baranja County
Baranya (region)